Thomas Hennessy (born June 11, 1994) is an American football long snapper for the New York Jets of the National Football League (NFL).  He played college football at Duke. He has also been a member of the Indianapolis Colts.

Early years
Hennessy played high school football at Don Bosco Preparatory High School in Ramsey, New Jersey, where he was a three-year letterman. He helped the team to a three-year record of 35–0. The school also won three state championships and were named national champions by USA Today in 2009 and 2011. In the class of 2012, he was rated the ninth best long snapper in the country by Kohl's.

College career
Hennessy played for the Duke Blue Devils of Duke University from 2013 to 2016. He was redshirted in 2012. He started all 14 games in 2013 and played 149 total snaps. Hennessy also recorded one solo tackle. He started all 13 games in 2014 and played 133 total snaps. He also recorded one solo tackle and one tackle assist. Hennessy started all 13 games in 2015 and played 144 total snaps. He started all 12 games in 2016 and played 119 total snaps. He also recorded one solo tackle. He played in 52 games, all starts, during his college career and played 545 total snaps. He also recorded three solo tackles and one tackle assist. Hennessy majored in biology and minored in psychology at Duke.

Professional career
Hennessy was rated the 19th long snapper in the 2017 NFL Draft by NFLDraftScout.com.

Indianapolis Colts
After going undrafted, Hennessy signed with the Indianapolis Colts on May 4, 2017.

New York Jets

On August 28, 2017, Hennessy was traded to the New York Jets for safety Ronald Martin.

On October 5, 2019, Hennessy signed a four-year, $4.4 million contract extension with the Jets.

Personal life
Thomas Hennessy grew up in Bardonia, New York. His brother, Matthew Hennessy, plays center for the Atlanta Falcons. Thomas and his brother grew up New York Giants fans. In 2019, he married former Duke volleyball player, Christina Vucich Hennessy.

References

External links
College stats

1994 births
Living people
American football long snappers
Don Bosco Preparatory High School alumni
Duke Blue Devils football players
Indianapolis Colts players
New York Jets players
People from Clarkstown, New York
Players of American football from New York (state)
Sportspeople from the New York metropolitan area